Janez Bitenc (25 October 1925 – 4 February 2005) was a Slovene composer and music teacher, best known for the music he wrote for over 400 children's songs and musical stories.

Bitenc was born in Ljubljana. He studied music at the Academy of Music in Ljubljana where he graduated in 1952. 
As composing music he also wrote the lyrics for many of his children's songs and published book of stories for children. In 1971, he won the Levstik Award for his book of songs for young children Ciciban poje (Ciciban Sings). He died in Ljubljana at the age of 79 years.

Bitenc's songs are known by more or less all pre-school and primary school children in Slovenia.

Selected Works for Children

  (Ciciban Sings), 1971
  (The Sun Is Smiling), 1985
  (Little Jake's Hat), 1987
  (Three Little Cockrels), 1987
  (The Silver Button), 1987
  (The Wooden Bird and Other Musical Stories), 1991
  (Teddies at the Fair), 1993
  (About the Bunny Who Lost the Key), 1993
  (The Wandering Little Cloud). 1995
  (Lakotaj the Dragon), 1998
  (Meta the Bear, Jaka the Bear and the Magic Mirror), 2001
  (A Christmas Tale), 2003
  (Pepinka the Snowflake), 2004
  (Where is My Hat?) 2004
  (Mittypins the Kitten), 2005
  (Vila the Kitten, Maya the Fairy and the River Man), 2005
  (Monica the Cat and the Little Star Lučka), 2005
  (On Cats That Weave Dreams), 2005
  (The First Day of School at Cat School), 2005
  (Kitty's Dreams), 2005
  (Three Little Cats Go Walkabouts), 2005

References

Slovenian composers
Male composers
Slovenian children's writers
1925 births
2005 deaths
Levstik Award laureates
Slovenian music educators
University of Ljubljana alumni
Musicians from Ljubljana
Slovenian male musicians